Llangeinwen is a village on the island of Anglesey in the community of Rhosyr.

It is the location of St Ceinwen's Church, Llangeinwen.

Welsh educator and founder of Aberystwyth University, Hugh Owen was born in the village.

References

Villages in Anglesey
Rhosyr